Maya Awards is an annual Indonesian film awards initiated in 2012 by Indonesian online film enthusiasts who were active on Twitter. It follows the concept of similar awards, with nominations and awards given to each year's best local productions.

The first annual Maya Awards was held on December 15, 2012 in Jakarta. It has been cited by local media outlets as the "Indonesian Golden Globe" with the annual Citra Awards of Indonesian Film Festival being the Indonesian equivalent of Academy Awards.

The nominations and winners of the awards are selected by a panel of judges consisting of Indonesian film critics and filmmakers, including directors, actors, and actresses. The festival was founded by local film critic Hafiz Husni.

Categories
 Best Feature Film
 Best Director
 Best Actor in a Leading Role
 Best Actress in a Leading Role
 Best Actor in a Supporting Role
 Best Actress in a Supporting Role
 Best Young Performer
 Best New Performer (2012)
 Best New Actor (since 2013)
 Best New Actress (since 2013)
 Best Screenplay (2012)
 Best Original Screenplay (since 2013)
 Best Adapted Screenplay (since 2013)
 Best Cinematography
 Best Costume Design
 Best Makeup & Hairstyling
 Best Sound Design
 Best Art Direction
 Best Film Score
 Best Editing
 Best Special Effects
 Best Poster Design
 Best Theme Song
 Best Documentary
 Best Short Film
 Best Short Animated Film
 Best Omnibus Film (2012)
 Best Segment in an Omnibus (2013-present)
 Best Actor in an Omnibus
 Best Actress in an Omnibus
 Best Regional Film
 Best Film Critic

Ceremonies

References

External links
Official Website

 
Recurring events established in 2012
Indonesian film awards